Shooting at the 2011 Island Games was held from 28 June to 1 July 2011 at Sainham, Godshill.

Events

Medal table

Men

Women

References
Shooting Clay Pigeon at the 2011 Island Games
Shooting Target at the 2011 Island Games

2011 Island Games
Island Games
Shooting at the Island Games